Ninia psephota, the red-bellied ccffee snake or Cope's coffee snake , is a species of snake in the family Colubridae.  The species is native to Panama and Costa Rica.

References

Ninia
Snakes of Central America
Reptiles of Panama
Reptiles of Costa Rica
Reptiles described in 1875
Taxa named by Edward Drinker Cope